The Democratic Socialist Movement (DSM) is a Trotskyist political party in Nigeria.  It is affiliated to the Committee for a Workers' International, of which it is the second largest section.

Foundation
The Democratic  Socialist Movement was founded in 1986 at a conference of labour and student socialist activists. Due to the ongoing military dictatorship the organisation only operated in a semi-open manner and was identified mainly by the name of its newspaper, Labour Militant (1987–1994) and Militant (1994–1998). Following the death of junta leader Sani Abacha in June 1998 and the impending end of military rule, the DSM launched as an open organisation in July of that year.

Campaigns
During the first 13 years of the section's existence they were heavily involved in fighting against the dictatorship in Nigeria at that time. Since then they have continued to fight for full democratic rights, but also for the rights of workers. This campaigning has led to the arrest several times of leading DSM activists.
More recently, the DSM played a leading role in the general strike of June 2007 against high fuel prices.

The DSM launched the Education Rights Campaign, mobilised for a national day of action on education and jobs on 19 June 2013.

Members of the DSM protested at the South African High Commission in Lagos against the Marikana massacre in Lonmin, in which 34 miners were killed.

Alliances
The DSM has argued since the 1980s for the formation of a mass working people's party and participated in the briefly lived Nigerian Labour Party in 1989. They argue that such a party should be wholly opposed to neo-liberalism and privatisation.

National Conscience Party
In 1994 the DSM joined in the founding by Gani Fawehinmi of the National Conscience Party. In the 2003 elections, the DSM stood as candidates for the NCP and achieved some of the party's highest votes. However, in 2007 DSM members democratically elected at a Statewide NCP conference were bureaucratically replaced as NCP candidates in Lagos State by the current NCP leadership, leading local members to withdraw their candidates from the elections. Since then, Lagos State NCP has quit the National Conscience Party.

Socialist Party of Nigeria
The DSM launched an initiative for the Socialist Party of Nigeria which was inaugurated on 16 November 2013 in Lagos.

Split
Echoing a split in the Committee for a Workers' International the previous  year, in June 2020 a minority of the DSM left to found the Movement for a Socialist Alternative, which is aligned with the International Socialist Alternative, while DSM has aligned itself with the refounded Committee for a Workers' International.

References

External links
Democratic Socialist Movement
Committee for a Workers' International

Nigeria
Political parties established in 1998
Communist parties in Nigeria
Trotskyist organizations in Africa
1986 establishments in Nigeria
Political parties in Lagos
Political parties in Nigeria